Chalaki Mogudu Chadastapu Pellam is a 1989 Telugu-language comedy film, produced by G. Nirmala under the Nirmala Arts banner and directed by Relangi Narasimha Rao. It stars Rajendra Prasad, Rajani  and music composed by J. V. Raghavulu. The film was recorded as a Hit at the box office. This movie was remade in Kannada as Golmal Radhakrishna   (1990) and was also remade in Tamil as Pondatti Pondattithan (1991).

Plot
The film begins with the marriage of Giri (Rajendra Prasad) and Seeta (Rajani). Seeta is an Orthodox woman, who troubles Giri with her traditional customs on the provocation of her grandmother Akhilandeswari (Nirmalamma). Giri works at the branch office of a chit fund company owned by Krishna (Nutan Prasad). Krishna leads a happy family life with his wife Radha (Y. Vijaya). Once he visits the branch office, appreciates Giri's sincerity, gives him the promotion and he is transferred to head office. In the process of searching for a rental house, Giri is attracted towards a prostitute Sandhya (Chandrika). But to his misfortune, they were caught by Police. To escape, he introduces her as his wife and for the witness they call Krishna. Krishna takes them and keeps in his opposite house, helpless Giri has to obey his order. Meanwhile, Seeta along with her grandmother reaches Giri. Now a confusion drama starts, Giri is stuck between both. Meanwhile, Sandhya's elder sister Ranganayaki (Mamatha) also enters the scene and makes a lot of mess. They also create disputes between Radha and Krishna. The rest of the story is a comic tale of how Giri gets rid of all these problems.

Cast
Rajendra Prasad as Giri
Rajani as Seeta
Nutan Prasad as Krishna
Allu Ramalingaiah as Inspector Ramadasu
Raavi Kondala Rao as Manager
Sanjeevi as Prasad
Dr. Siva Prasad as Kannaiah
Potti Prasad as Kaasipati
Srilakshmi as Janaki
Mamatha as Ranganayaki
Chandrika as Sandhya
Y. Vijaya as Radha
Nirmalamma as Akhilandeswari

Soundtrack

Music composed by J. V. Raghavulu.

References

External links

Indian comedy films
1980s Telugu-language films
Films directed by Relangi Narasimha Rao
Films scored by J. V. Raghavulu
Telugu films remade in other languages
1989 comedy films
1989 films